Gavialinae is a subfamily of large semiaquatic crocodilian reptiles, resembling crocodiles, but with much thinner snouts. Gavialinae is one of the two major subfamilies within the family Gavialidae - the other being the subfamily Tomistominae, which contains the false gharial and extinct relatives.

Classification
Gavialinae was first proposed by Nopcsa in 1923, and was cladistically defined by Brochu in 2003 as Gavialis gangeticus (the gharial) and all crocodylians more closely related to it than to Tomistoma schlegelii (the false gharial). This is a stem-based definition for gavialinae, and means that it includes more basal extinct gavialine ancestors that are more closely related to the gharial than to the false gharial.

The false gharial was once thought to be only distantly related to the gharial despite its similar appearance. The false gharial and other tomistomines were traditionally classified within the superfamily Crocodyloidea as close relatives of crocodiles, based solely on morphological evidence. However, recent molecular studies using DNA sequencing have found that they are in fact more closely related to each other than any other extant (living) crocodilian.

The placement of extinct gavialids between Gavialinae and Tomistominae is unresolved.

The below cladogram is from the 2022 Iijima et al. study:

References

Gavialidae
Reptile subfamilies